Gillespie House is a historic home located at Guilderland in Albany County, New York.  It was built about 1840 and is a small, -story Greek Revival–style farmhouse with a center entrance and small rear ell. It features five small eyebrow windows in the eave. Also on the property is a garage.

It was listed on the National Register of Historic Places in 1982.

References

Houses on the National Register of Historic Places in New York (state)
Houses completed in 1840
Greek Revival houses in New York (state)
Houses in Albany County, New York
National Register of Historic Places in Albany County, New York